Nedostupov is a rural locality (a khutor) in Krasnoyarskoye Rural Settlement, Zhirnovsky District, Volgograd Oblast, Russia. The population was 263 as of 2010. There are 8 streets.

Geography 
Nedostupov is located in steppe of Khopyorsko-Buzulukskaya Plain, on the right bank of the Burluk River, 52 km south of Zhirnovsk (the district's administrative centre) by road. Borodachi is the nearest rural locality.

References 

Rural localities in Zhirnovsky District